The 2013 Asian Weightlifting Championships was held in Astana, Kazakhstan from June 21–26, 2013. It was the 44th men's and 25th women's championship.

Medal summary

Men

Women

Medal table 

Ranking by Big (Total result) medals 

Ranking by all medals: Big (Total result) and Small (Snatch and Clean & Jerk)

Team ranking

Men

Women

Participating nations 
136 athletes from 18 nations competed.

 (13)
 (15)
 (15)
 (11)
 (8)
 (2)
 (4)
 (15)
 (8)
 (2)
 (2)
 (11)
 (1)
 (3)
 (3)
 (5)
 (4)
 (14)

References

Results

External links
Start List

Asian Weightlifting Championships
Asian
W
International weightlifting competitions hosted by Kazakhstan